Mitrella semiconvexa is a species of sea snail in the family Columbellidae, the dove snails.

Description
The shell may reach 20 mm in length.

The ovate, conical shell is very pointed at its summit. It is pale red, often ornamented, with longitudinal waved and distant bands. Sometimes elongated spots appear upon the whorls of the spire, which are eight or nine in number; the lowest are convex. The base of the shell is marked with very fine, and very approximate striae. The ovate aperture is elongated, of a whitish color. The outer lip is rounded and striated internally. The columella is arched and smooth.

Distribution
This marine species is endemic to Australia where it occurs off New South Wales, South Australia, Tasmania, Victoria and Western Australia.

References

 Lamarck, J.B.P.A. de M. 1822. Histoire naturelle des Animaux sans Vertèbres. Paris : J.B. Lamarck Vol. 7 711 pp.
 Reeve, L.A. 1859. Monograph of the genus Columbella. pl. 1, 24–37 in Reeve, L.A. (ed). Conchologia Iconica. London : L. Reeve & Co. Vol. 11.
 Cotton, B.C. 1957. Australian Recent and Tertiary Species of the Molluscan Family Pyrenidae. Adelaide
 Wilson, B. 1994. Australian Marine Shells. Prosobranch Gastropods. Kallaroo, WA : Odyssey Publishing Vol. 2 370 pp.

semiconvexa
Gastropods of Australia
Gastropods described in 1822